Jakub Dvorský (born August 19, 1978) is a designer and video game creator from Brno, Czech Republic. In 2003, he founded Amanita Design, a small independent game developing studio based in the Czech Republic.

Life and career
Between 1994–1997 he was part of video game studio NoSense. He participated in development of projects Dračí Historie ("Dragon History"), Katapult ("Catapult") and Asmodeus: Tajemný kraj Ruthaniolu ("Asmodeus: Mysterious Country of Ruthaniol"). The studio was defunct in 1997. In years 1997–2003 he studied at Academy of Arts, Architecture and Design in Prague. He was taught by Jiří Barta.

In 2003 he established the company Amanita Design and released his first project Samorost ("Maverick"). Amanita Design was partially made from former NoSense staff. The studio develops games in Flash. Most of the projects were Point-and-click adventure games. Dvorský worked on projects such as Samorost 2, Machinarium and Samorost 3 which was released on March 24, 2016 after five years in development. His latest game, Happy Game, was released 2021. He also worked on animated film Kooky for which he gained nomination for Český lev

Games 
 Dragon History - (1995)
 Katapult - (1996)
 Asmodeus - (1997)
 Samorost (2003)
 Rocketman VC – game for Nike (2004)
 Samorost 2 (2005)
 The Quest for the Rest – game for The Polyphonic Spree (2006)
 Questionaut – educational game for BBC (2008)
 Machinarium (2009)
 Botanicula (2012)
 Samorost 3 (2016)
 Chuchel (2018)
 Pilgrims (2019)
 Creaks (2020)
 Happy Game (2021)

Awards
With his studio Amanita Design, Dvorský has won a lot of awards. Machinarium won the award for the Best Indie Game 2009  by Gamasutra and the award for the Best Soundtrack in a video game by PC Gamer. Botanicula won a European Games Award 2012 in the category "Best European Adventure Game".

References

External links 
 Amanita Design
 Dragon History

Businesspeople from Brno
1978 births
Living people
Czech video game designers
Academy of Arts, Architecture and Design in Prague alumni